Cockshott is a surname. Notable people with the surname include:

Paul Cockshott (born 1952), British computer scientist and economist
George Cockshott (1875–1953), British naval architect
Gerald Cockshott (1915–1979), English composer, librettist, writer, and teacher

See also
Cockshutt (disambiguation)